Ada ; ; is a village in Hardin County, Ohio, United States, located about  southwest of Toledo. The population was 5,952 at the 2010 census.

History
Following the 1817 Treaty of Fort Meigs, the Shawnee Indians held reservation land at Hog Creek near Ada. Ada itself was originally called Johnstown, platted in 1853 by S. M. Johnson when the railroad was extended to that point. When a post office was established it was called Ada Post Office, named after the postmaster's daughter, Ada.  The post office has been in operation since 1854. Ada has been noted for having one of the shortest place names in Ohio. The National Arbor Day Foundation has qualified Ada as a Tree City USA since 1981.

Geography
Ada is located at  (40.768883, -83.822298).

The area surrounding the village is mostly farmland and small plots of forest. Hog Creek is the only waterway of note and snakes around the village to the north and the east.

Demographics

2010 census
As of the census of 2010, there were 5,952 people, 1,729 households, and 846 families living in the village. The racial makeup of the village was 93.5% White, 1.9% African American, 0.1% Native American, 1.9% Asian, 0.7% from other races, and 1.9% from two or more races. Hispanic or Latino of any race were 1.6% of the population.

There were 1,729 households, of which 24.7% had children under the age of 18 living with them, 37.7% were married couples living together, 8.2% had a female householder with no husband present, 3.1% had a male householder with no wife present, and 51.1% were non-families. 38.0% of all households were made up of individuals, and 8.5% had someone living alone who was 65 years of age or older. The average household size was 2.26 and the average family size was 3.01.

The median age in the village was 22.2 years. 13.6% of residents were under the age of 18; 49.5% were between the ages of 18 and 24; 17.2% were from 25 to 44; 13.5% were from 45 to 64; and 6.3% were 65 years of age or older. The gender makeup of the village was 50.8% male and 49.2% female.

2000 census
As of the census of 2000, there were 5,582 people, 1,783 households, and 850 families living in the village. The population density was 2,982.7 people per square mile (1,152.5/km). There were 1,948 housing units at an average density of 1,040.9 per square mile (402.2/km). The racial makeup of the village was 95.50% White, 1.58% African American, 0.13% Native American, 1.25% Asian, 0.30% from other races, and 1.24% from two or more races. Hispanic or Latino of any race were 0.59% of the population.

There were 1,783 households, out of which 22.9% had children under the age of 18 living with them, 37.6% were married couples living together, 7.3% had a female householder with no husband present, and 52.3% were non-families. 36.6% of all households were made up of individuals, and 9.0% had someone living alone who was 65 years of age or older. The average household size was 2.22 and the average family size was 2.92.

In the village, the population was spread out, with 13.9% under the age of 18, 48.6% from 18 to 24, 18.0% from 25 to 44, 12.5% from 45 to 64, and 7.1% who were 65 years of age or older. The median age was 22 years. For every 100 females, there were 96.1 males. For every 100 females age 18 and over, there were 94.4 males.

The median income for a household in the village was $24,665, and the median income for a family was $39,300. Males had a median income of $32,143 versus $23,750 for females. The per capita income for the village was $12,561. About 11.7% of families and 21.9% of the population were below the poverty line, including 10.9% of those under age 18 and 19.4% of those age 65 or over.

Economy
The Wilson Sporting Goods NFL football manufacturing facility is located in Ada, and is the only leather football manufacturing facility in the United States.

Education

Public Schools
Ada Exempted Village Public School houses grades K-12 and most of the administration. The district spends $7,701 per student annually ($925 lower than the state average).

Ada High School's sports teams participate in the Northwest Conference — an athletic body sanctioned by the Ohio High School Athletic Association (OHSAA) — which includes the Ada Bulldogs,
Allen East Mustangs, Bluffton Pirates, Columbus Grove Bulldogs, Convoy Crestview Knights, Delphos Jefferson Wildcats, Lincolnview Lancers, Paulding Panthers, and Spencerville Bearcats.

College education
Ada is the home of Ohio Northern University, a private University comprising five colleges: Arts and Sciences, Business Administration, Engineering, Pharmacy, and Law.

Media
Three media outlets currently operate in the Village of Ada. The Ada Herald is a weekly newspaper, AdaIcon.com is a news website, and WOHA, a non-commercial, religious radio station owned by Holy Family Communications.  This station was formerly WONB, an independent, non-commercial radio station run by Ohio Northern University until it was sold in 2020.  WONB exists online as a live-stream service.

Transportation

Notable people
 John Berton, computer graphics animator
 Zac Dysert, American football player
 Rollo May, an existential psychologist
 Carey Orr, cartoonist
 Lee Tressel, College Football Hall of Famer, father of former Ohio State University football coach Jim Tressel

References

 
Villages in Hardin County, Ohio
Villages in Ohio
Ohio Northern University
Populated places established in 1853
1853 establishments in Ohio